Progressive Student Labor Front (in Arabic: جبهة العمل الطلابي التقدمية) is a Palestinian student organization. It is politically linked to the Popular Front for the Liberation of Palestine.

External links
www.pslf.org
Popular Front for the Liberation of Palestine
Student political organizations
Student wings of communist parties
Student wings of Palestinian political parties